The 2013 Copa Colombia, officially the 2013 Copa Postobón for sponsorship reasons, was the 11th edition of the Copa Colombia, the national cup competition for clubs of DIMAYOR. It began on February 15 and ended on November 8. The tournament comprised a total of 36 teams. The winner earned a berth to the 2014 Copa Sudamericana.

Group stage
The 36 teams were divided into six groups based on each separate region of Colombia. Each group was played in home-and-away round-robin format. The group winners and runners-up, along with the four best third-placed teams, advanced to the Round of 16. The matches were played from February 13 to June 5.

Group A

Group B

Group C

Group D

Group E

Group F

Ranking of third-placed teams

Knockout phase
Each tie in the knockout phase was played in home-and-away two-legged format. In each tie, the team which had the better overall record up to that stage host the second leg, except in the round of 16 where the group winners automatically hosted the second leg. In case of a tie in aggregate score, neither the away goals rule nor extra time was applied, and the tie was decided by a penalty shoot-out.

Bracket

Round of 16
First legs: August 7, 8, 13, 14; Second legs: August 14, 15, September 9.

Quarterfinals
First legs: September 11; Second legs: September 17, 18.

Semifinals
First legs: October 10, 13; Second legs: October 16.

Final
First leg: November 13; Second leg: November 17.

References

External links
 Copa Postobón, DIMAYOR.com
 Copa Colombia 2013, Soccerway.com

Copa Colombia seasons
Colombia
Copa Colombia